The Atlantic City Convention Center is a large convention center located in Atlantic City, New Jersey.

History

The Center was developed as a part of the city's gateway redevelopment project, which also included Tanger Outlets The Walk and the Grand Boulevard. The building opened with a connected Sheraton hotel.

The building was constructed in its original design by Philadelphia green city planning firm WRT (Wallace, Roberts and Todd) by its senior architect at the time, the principal, and partner, Gilbert Rosenthal, AIA, to reflect its location, featuring wave-inspired carpets and a Rock Bar themed to the beach. The main lobby is contained within an atrium lit by 90 ft. high skylights.

Between the convention center and the Sheraton Hotel is a landscaped garden with an interactive bronze statue of Bert Parks holding a crown. When a visitor puts their head inside the crown and taps it, sensors activate a recorded playback of Parks singing "There She Is..." through speakers hidden behind nearby bushes.

Other facilities
The Center is connected to the Atlantic City Rail Terminal, containing New Jersey Transit's Atlantic City Line to Philadelphia.

References

External links
 Atlantic City Convention Center
 Atlantic City Tourism
 Miss America Organization
 New Jersey State Interscholastic Athletic Association

Buildings and structures in Atlantic City, New Jersey
Tourist attractions in Atlantic County, New Jersey
Convention centers in New Jersey
Event venues established in 1997
1997 establishments in New Jersey